Innishannon Steam and Vintage Rally is held between Crossbarry and Innishannon (Irish: Inis Eonáin), a village on the main Cork–Bandon road (N71) in County Cork, Province of Munster, Ireland. The show takes place in a 38-acre site.

History 

The rally has been running successfully since June 1998 and was awarded charitable status in 1999. All proceeds from the event go to the Irish Cancer Society. The rally takes place every June Bank Holiday weekend in Innishannon, Cork. The founding of the event was led by well known steam preservationist Tim Nagle of Kinsale.

Over the years the event has gained significant support. In the first year IR£5000 was handed over to the Irish Cancer Society. The second year saw IR£13,500 was donated; in 2000 the amount more than doubled to IR£27,500. Unfortunately due to the foot-and-mouth disease outbreak in 2001 no rally was held, but in 2002 €35,500 went to the Irish Cancer Society. In 2003 the event raised €60,000, and in 2005 €65,000.

Over the past 14 years, the rally has raised over €970,000 for the ICS.  The rally has broken the €1 million mark in 2012.

The Innishannon Steam and Vintage replaced the nearby Upton Steam Rally started in 1967/68 by Ned Foley of Youghal (Steam Roller Engine), Thos (Thomas) Scanlan of Ballyhooley (Overtime Tractor x2) and Brendan O Connell of Ballincollig (Army Truck) to fund / support Upton Brothers of Charity, the rally  which ceased in 1997, due to insurance concerns and costs.

Objectives 

This rally was originally created to promote heritage machinery of all classes at work and to provide a suitable venue for vintage enthusiasts to display their machines, as well as allowing the general public to view rare agricultural and mechanical treasures from the past. The exhibits include huge tractors, threshers, unique cars, motorbikes, oil and steam engines as well as experiencing a working forge. There is also a pet's corner, always popular with children, a cake sale, numerous stands and stalls with art and craft displays, a dog show, sheep dog trials, road rolling, stone crushing, line dancing and a non-stop disco. This is a fun-day out for collectors, enthusiasts and visitors alike with car parking and camping facilities set up in the village. Innishannon itself dates back to the sixth century and is surrounded by an ancient woodland and castle ruins.

The rally seeks to promote steam vintage and other items of heritage and also provide a venue suitable to the enthusiast to show items of yesteryear. It also allows the public to view such rare treasures. It also seeks raise funds for a needy and deserving cause, The Irish Cancer Society.

Event highlights 
Steam Engines / Cars / Tractors / Fire Engine Display / Motorcycles / Working Area / Cake Sale / 
Vintage Club Displays / Sheep Dog Trials / Stackmaking / Slow Tractor Race / Slow Steam Engine Race / Queen of Steam Competition / Oil Engines / Vintage Farm Machinery / Threshing / Wood Sawing / Stone Crushing / Road Rolling / Rural Crafts / Disco Dancing / Slow Steam Engine Race with Barrels / Musical Chairs with Tractors and Steam Engines / Dog Show for all Classes / Line Dancing.

See also
List of steam fairs

External links
Innishannon Steam and Vintage Rally – Official website

Steam festivals